Avallon is a commune in the Yonne department in Bourgogne-Franche-Comté in central-eastern France.

Name
Avallon, Latin Aballō, ablative Aballone, is ultimately derived from Gaulish *Aballū, oblique *Aballon- meaning "Apple-tree (place)" or "(place of the) "Apple Tree Goddess" (from Proto-Celtic *abalnā, cf. Old Irish aball, Welsh afall, Old Breton aball(en), "apple tree").

Geography
Avallon is located 50 km south-southeast of Auxerre, served by a branch of the Paris–Lyon railway and by exit 22 of the A6 motorway. The old town, with many winding cobblestone streets flanked by traditional stone and woodwork buildings, is situated on a flat promontory, the base of which is washed on the south by the river Cousin, on the east and west by small streams.

History
Chance finds of coins and pottery fragments and a fine head of Minerva are reminders of the Roman settlement carrying the Celtic name Aballo, a mutatio or post where fresh horses could be obtained. Two pink marble columns in the church of St-Martin du Bourg have been reused from an unknown temple (Princeton Encyclopedia). The Roman citadel, on a rocky spur overlooking the Cousin valley, has been Christianized as Montmarte ("Mount of the Martyrs").

Avallon (Aballo) was in the Middle Ages the seat of a viscounty dependent on the duchy of Burgundy; on the death of Charles the Bold in 1477, it passed under the royal authority. The castle, mentioned as early as the seventh century, has utterly disappeared.

King Arthur and the French Avallon theory

A theory exists which proposes that the Isle of Avalon mentioned in Arthurian legend is, in fact, Avallon in Burgundy.

Geoffrey Ashe first mentioned the French Avallon theory in his 1985 book, The Discovery of King Arthur. His theory is that "King Arthur" is based on the historical Romano-British supreme king Riothamus, who reigned between 454–470, and whose life and campaigns have parallels to the accounts of "King Arthur" in the first medieval accounts of King Arthur by Geoffrey of Monmouth (Historia Regum Britanniae, c. 1136). According to Ashe, in the year 470, Riothamus disappeared (and presumably died) in the neighborhood of Avallon after being defeated in the battle of Déols by Euric king of the Visigoths, whom the Western Roman Emperor Anthemius had hired Riothamus to fight against. This, and other aspects of his reign, made Ashe propose him as a candidate for the historical King Arthur, with Avallon becoming the Arthurian Avalon. No ancient source mentioning Riothamus places him anywhere near Avallon and Geoffrey of Monmouth, who is the first to mention "the isle of Avalon" (Latin insula Auallonis) and based his description of the isle on Classical descriptions of the Fortunate Isles, is explicit that it was an island in the western seas. In Geoffrey's day (and, indeed, going all the way back to geographers of antiquity), the Fortunate Isles were identified with the Canary Islands.

Population

Sights
Its chief building, the formerly collegiate church of Saint-Lazare, dates from the twelfth century, on an earlier foundation dedicated to Notre Dame. Vestiges of the earlier church were revealed beneath the high altar in an excavation of 1861.  The acquisition of a relic of Saint Lazare prompted its rededication: Saint Ladre is attested in the fourteenth century. It was the seat of an archdeaconate answering to the bishop of Autun. The two western portals are densely adorned with sculpture in the Romanesque style; the tower on the left of the facade was rebuilt in the seventeenth century. The Tour de l'Horloge, pierced by a gateway through which passes the Grande Rue, is an eleventh-century structure containing a museum on its second floor. Remains of the ancient fortifications, including seven of the flanking towers, are still to be seen. Avallon has a statue of Vauban, the military engineer of Louis XIV.

Economy

As of the early 20th century, the manufacture of biscuits and gingerbread, and the leather and farm implements supported the economy in Avallon, and there was considerable traffic on wood, wine, and the live-stock and agricultural produce in the surrounding country.

Miscellaneous

As of the early 20th century, the public institutions included the subprefecture, a tribunal of first instance, and a départemental college.

Twin towns
Avallon is twinned with:
 Pepinster, Belgium
 Cochem, Germany
 Tenterden, United Kingdom
 Saku, Japan

See also
Communes of the Yonne department
Parc naturel régional du Morvan

Notes

References

Attribution:

Further reading

External links

 
Medieval Zodiac Signs plus Monthly Labours from l'église Saint-Lazare, Avallon
Island of Avallon , French Avalon website
Avallon page on the site Bourgogne Romane

Communes of Yonne
Subprefectures in France
Burgundy